Nicolás Gabriel Cabré Brickenstaedt (born 6 February 1980) is an Argentine actor and television host. Known for his film, stage and television work, he has won ACE Award and earned four Martín Fierro Award nominations. Cabré is also a regular feature in Argentine press, and his off–screen life is widely reported.

Filmography

Awards and nominations

Nominations
 2013 Martín Fierro Awards
 Best actor of daily comedy (for Mis amigos de siempre)

References

External links 
 

1980 births
Living people
Argentine male film actors
Argentine male stage actors
Argentine male television actors
Argentine television presenters
Argentine male child actors
Male actors from Buenos Aires